Colorado Sundown is a black and white 1952 American Western film directed by William Witney. It mixes genres: western, musical, crime story and comedy.

Interspersed during the action are musical selections sung by The Republic Rhythm Riders, including a rare solo by Slim Pickens

Plot
The film opens with a runaway stage with Rex (Rex Allen) and Slim (Slim Pickens) in pursuit.
Rex jumps on and stops the stage, rescuing Jackie (Mary Ellen Kay) and Mattie (Louise Beavers). However, they mistake him for the careless stagecoach driver.

Troubles arise when Jackie and Slim find they are inheriting a third share of a ranch along with Carrie Hurley (June Vincent) and her brother Daniel (Fred Graham). The next day Carrie persuades Slim and Jackie to sell their portion of the ranch because of supposedly infected trees but Rex shows and stops the sale. Carrie's younger brother Dusty Hurley arrives and agrees to impersonate John Stoker, a forest ranger who has been poisoned by Carrie.
Stoker convinces some of the ranchers to sell but Rex is suspicious and writes to the forest service.  The letter from the forest service arrives and Maddie takes it but is shot by the fake Stoker who takes it to Carrie who hides it. Rex arrives and fights with Stoker who collapses in Carrie's office and she shoots Rex wounding him. Slim shows up and takes Rex and Stoker to Doc but Stoker dies along the way.  A storm ensues and all pitch in to stop the dam from breaking.  The storm abates revealing the real rangers body which along with Dusty's body are taken to doc who finds that both have been poisoned.  Meanwhile the ranchers and lumbermen begin to fight but are stopped by Rex and the sheriff. Rex then catches up with Carrie and Daniel. He fights with Daniel and they both fall into the river.  Rex emerges the victor and carts Carrie off to jail. He bides Jackie and Slim farewell and rides off alone. A goat butts Slim causing a bucket of milk to land on his head.

Cast
Rex Allen as the Arizona Cowboy
Koko the dog as himself
Mary Ellen Kay as Jackie Reynolds
Slim Pickens as Joshua 'Slim' Pickens / Ma Pickens
June Vincent as Carrie Hurley
Fred Graham as Daniel Hurley
 John Daheim as Dusty Hurley aka John Stocker
Louise Beavers as Mattie, Jackie's Maid
Chester Clute as Lawyer Davis
 Clarence Straight as Mail Man driving the Hack
 The Republic Rhythm Riders as Ranch workers, Musicians

External links

1952 films
1950s English-language films
American black-and-white films
1952 Western (genre) films
Republic Pictures films
American Western (genre) films
Films directed by William Witney
1950s American films